The Philadelphia Passion was a women's American football team that played in the Legends Football League and were based in the Delaware Valley.

The Passion was one of the ten inaugural teams established in 2009 as part of the Lingerie Bowl's expansion into a full-fledged league called the Lingerie Football League (LFL). They played their home games at the Sun National Bank Center in Trenton, New Jersey. The team advanced to the league's championship game, still called the Lingerie Bowl and taking place during the Super Bowl, in 2011 and 2012, losing to the Los Angeles Temptation both times. The league then postponed the 2012–13 season.

In 2013, the league rebranded as the Legends Football League and the team moved their home games to the outdoor PPL Park in Chester, Pennsylvania. The Passion qualified for their third straight championship, rebranded as the Legends Cup, and lost to the Chicago Bliss. The team was then suspended by the league in December 2013 and never returned.

2010–11 roster

References

External links
 
Article about Jaime Diamonds

American football teams in New Jersey
American football teams in Philadelphia
Legends Football League US teams
Sports in Trenton, New Jersey
American football teams established in 2009
American football teams disestablished in 2014
2009 establishments in New Jersey
2014 disestablishments in Pennsylvania
Women's sports in New Jersey
Women's sports in Pennsylvania